{{DISPLAYTITLE:C5H8O}}
The molecular formula C5H8O (molar mass: 84.12 g/mol) may refer to:

 Cyclopentanone
 2,3-Dihydropyran
 trans-2-Methyl-2-butenal
 2-Methylbut-3-yn-2-ol
 3-Penten-2-one